Events from the year 1665 in art.

Events
 April – Gian Lorenzo Bernini arrives in Paris, where he remains until November, fêted by the population.
 Claude Perrault begins work on the eastern wing of the Louvre.

Works

 Gabriël Metsu 
Lady Reading a Letter (1662-65; National Gallery of Ireland)
’’ Rembrandt Van Riji
David and Uriah 
Man Writing a Letter (1662-65; National Gallery of Ireland)
 Murillo – The Dolorosa Madonna
 Jan Vermeer
A Lady Writing a Letter (National Gallery of Art, Washington, D.C.)
Woman with a Pearl Necklace

Births
March 14 - Giuseppe Crespi, Italian late Baroque painter of the Bolognese School (died 1747)
March 21 - José Benito de Churriguera, Spanish architect and sculptor (died 1725)
May 7 - Maurelio Scanavini, Italian painter of the Baroque period, mainly active in Ferrara (died 1698)
date unknown
Claude Duflos, French engraver (died 1727)
Jean-Louis Lemoyne, French sculptor (died 1755)
Francesco Penso, Venetian sculptor (died 1737)
Tommaso Redi Italian painter, active in his native Florence (died 1726)
Norbert Roettiers, Flemish engraver (died 1727)
Giovanni Enrico Vaymer, Italian portrait painter (died 1738)

Deaths
January 16 - Charles Alphonse du Fresnoy, painter (born 1611)
May - Pieter Jansz. Saenredam, painter (born 1597)
July 3 - Francesco Costanzo Cattaneo, Italian painter (born 1602)
July 14 - Aniello Falcone, Italian Baroque painter noted for his painted depictions of battle scenes (born 1600)
July 27 - Francesco Cairo, Italian painter active in Lombardy and Piedmont (born 1607)
August 25 - Elisabetta Sirani, Italian painter (born 1638)
November 19 – Nicolas Poussin, painter (born 1594)
December 19 - Gerard van Zyl, Dutch Golden Age painter of portraits and genre scenes (born 1607)
date unknown
Antonio Bacci, Italian still life painter (born 1600)
Albert Eckhout – Dutch portrait and still life painter (born 1610)
Jan Sadeler II, Flemish engraver of the Sadeler family (born 1588)
Thomas Simon, English medalist (born c.1623)
Friedrich van Hulsen, Dutch printmaker and engraver (born 1580)

References

 
Years of the 17th century in art
1660s in art